Nikita Filippov (born 7 October 1991 in Almaty) is a Kazakhstani pole vaulter. He competed in the pole vault event at the 2012 Summer Olympics.

He has an outdoor personal best of 5.65 metres (2015) and an indoor personal best of 5.50 metres (2011).

Competition record

References

1991 births
Living people
Sportspeople from Almaty
Kazakhstani male pole vaulters
Olympic male pole vaulters
Olympic athletes of Kazakhstan
Athletes (track and field) at the 2012 Summer Olympics
Athletes (track and field) at the 2016 Summer Olympics
Asian Games competitors for Kazakhstan
Athletes (track and field) at the 2014 Asian Games
Athletes (track and field) at the 2018 Asian Games
Universiade gold medalists in athletics (track and field)
Universiade gold medalists for Kazakhstan
Universiade bronze medalists for Kazakhstan
Medalists at the 2013 Summer Universiade
Medalists at the 2015 Summer Universiade
World Athletics Championships athletes for Kazakhstan
Asian Indoor Athletics Championships winners
20th-century Kazakhstani people
21st-century Kazakhstani people